Coloured Stone is an Aboriginal Australian band whose members originate from the Koonibba Mission, west of Ceduna, South Australia. The band performs using guitar, bass, drums, and Aboriginal instruments – didjeridu, bundawuthada (gong stone) and clap sticks – to play traditional music.

"Mouydjengara" is a whale-dreaming song of the Mirning people.

Background and members
 
The original Coloured Stone band members were three brothers, Bunna Lawrie (drums, lead vocals, songwriter), and Neil Coaby (rhythm guitar and backing vocals) and Mackie Coaby (bass guitar and backing vocals), and their nephew, Bruce (aka Bunny) Mundy (lead guitar and backing vocals). All are from the community of Koonibba, South Australia.

Lawrie is  a member and respected elder of the Mirning people coastal Nullarbor region in South Australia. He is known as a whale-dreamer, songman, medicine man and storyteller. He is Coloured Stone's founding member and chief songwriter.

The band's single, "Black Boy" was a success when first released in 1984. It became the number one song in Fiji, and sold 120,000 copies. The lyrics included the line "Black boy, black boy, the colour of your skin is your pride and joy", which was a somewhat revolutionary sentiment for Aboriginal people in the 1980s.

Lawrie's son, Jason Scott, played guitar, bass, drums and didgeridoo for Coloured Stone from the age of 13 years. His first major gig was "Rock Against Racism" in Adelaide. Scott has also performed at the Sydney Opera House and he toured the US in 1994 with the Wirrangu Band as part of a cultural exchange program. With his band Desert Sea, Scott released an album in 2002 titled From the Desert to the Sea.

The current members of Coloured Stone are: Lawrie (vocals, rhythm guitar, didgeridoo, gong stone), Selwyn Burns (lead guitar, vocals), Peter Hood (drums), Cee Cee Honeybee (backing vocals) and guest musicians (bass guitarist, didgeridoo player, keyboard player.

Support for Aboriginal causes

On the first day of an April 1998 outdoor gig, Wild Water opened for Coloured Stone and Regurgitator at Brown's Mart Community Arts Centre. On the third day the band went to Jabiru, Northern Territory, to play at the Sports and Social Club. At dawn on day four, Coloured Stone travelled to Jabiluka to play on a makeshift stage in support of the Mirrar people's protest blockade of the road to a uranium mine on Mirrar land.

From March to August 2001, Lawrie and fellow Aboriginal musician Barry Cedric took part in a songwriting workshop for Aboriginal youth at Yarrabah. The young people learned to play musical instruments, compose a song and set it to music. At the end, six youths went to Cairns to record their song, "One Fire", in a recording studio.

In the media
"A Rare Gem: Coloured Stone" is an episode of 2013 TV series Desperate Measures, which features the band.

Awards and recognition
1978: Perth's 3rd National Aboriginal Country Music Festival Talent (Western Australia) – First Prize for Best Band
1978: Perth's 3rd National Aboriginal Country Music Festival Talent  – Best Original Song for "Dancing in the Moonlight"
1995: Brian Syron Scholarship Award (Australia) – Contribution to Aboriginal music
2012: National NAIDOC Lifetime Achievement Award (Australia) to Bunna Lawrie

ARIA Music Awards
The ARIA Music Awards is an annual awards ceremony that recognises excellence, innovation, and achievement across all genres of Australian music. Coloured Stone has one ARIA Award and been nominated for three, as follows:

|-
| 1987
| Human Love
| ARIA Award for Best Indigenous Release
| 
|-
| 1989
| Wild Desert Rose
| ARIA Award for Best Cover Art
| 
|-
| 1990
| Crazy Mind
| ARIA Award for Best Indigenous Release
| 
|-
| 1993
| Inma Juju
| ARIA Award for Best Indigenous Release
| 
|-

Deadly Awards
The Deadly Awards, (commonly known simply as The Deadlys), was an annual celebration of Australian Aboriginal and Torres Strait Islander achievement in music, sport, entertainment and community. It ran from 1995 to 2013

|-
| Deadly Awards 1999
| Coloured Stone
| Outstanding Contribution to Aboriginal Music
| 
|-

Don Banks Music Award
The Don Banks Music Award was established in 1984 to publicly honour a senior artist of high distinction who has made an outstanding and sustained contribution to music in Australia. It was founded by the Australia Council in honour of Don Banks, Australian composer, performer and the first chair of its music board.

|-
| 2000
| Bunna Lawrie
| Don Banks Music Award
| 
|-

Music Victoria Awards
The Music Victoria Awards are an annual awards night celebrating Victorian music. They commenced in 2006.

! 
|-
| Music Victoria Awards of 2014
| ''Dance to the Sun'
| Best Global or Reggae Album
| 
| 
|-

National Indigenous Music Awards
The National Indigenous Music Awards recognise excellence, innovation and leadership among Aboriginal and Torres Strait Islander musicians from throughout Australia. It commenced in 2004.

|-
| 2011 
| Coloured Stone
| Hall of Fame 
| 
|-

Discography

Albums

Compilation albums

Singles

References 

ARIA Award winners
Indigenous Australian musical groups
South Australian musical groups